List of villages in Araria
 List of villages in Arwal
 List of villages in Aurangabad
 List of villages in Banka
 List of villages in Begusarai
 List of villages in Bhagalpur
 List of villages in Bhojpur
 List of villages in Buxar
 list of village in Chhapra
 List of villages in East Champaran
 List of villages in Darbhanga district
 List of villages in Gaya
 List of villages in Gopalganj
 List of villages in Jamui
 List of villages in Jehanabad
 List of villages in Kaimur
 List of villages in Katihar
 List of villages in Khagaria
 List of villages in Kishanganj
 List of villages in Lakhisarai
 List of villages in Madhepura
 List of villages in Madhubani
 List of villages in Munger
 List of villages in Muzaffarpur 
• Dharampur Susta
 List of villages in Nalanda
 List of villages in Nawada
 List of villages in Patna
 List of villages in Purnia
 List of villages in Rohtas
 List of villages in Saharsa
List of villages in Samastipur
 List of villages in Saran
 List of villages in Sheikhpura
 List of villages in Sheohar
List of villages in Sitamarhi
 List of villages in Siwan
 List of villages in Supaul
 List of villages in Vaishali
 List of villages in West Champaran

See also 

 India
 Bihar
 Government of Bihar
 Administration in Bihar
 Cities in Bihar
 Districts of Bihar
 Divisions of India
 Subdivisions of Bihar
 Blocks in Bihar
 Villages in Bihar

References

External links 

 Official government website